The Vavilov State Optical Institute in St Petersburg, Russia (named after Sergey Ivanovich Vavilov) is the largest research institute in optics in Russia.  It works both in pure and applied optics, and has a high reputation in the field of holography.

It was established in 1918 along the lines of a proposal by the physicist Dimitri Rozhdestvensky, who was the first director, a post he held until 1932.

It is part of the Shvabe holding.

It designs optical systems (Froptas In German) for many applications, including Russian reconnaissance satellites. It publishes the Journal of Optical Technology (Научно-технический «ОПТИЧЕСКИЙ ЖУРНАЛ»).

References

External links 
 Vavilov State Optical Institute

Research institutes in Russia
Shvabe Holding
Companies based in Saint Petersburg
Manufacturing companies of the Soviet Union
Research institutes in the Soviet Union